The 2017–18 North Florida Ospreys men's basketball team represented the University of North Florida during the 2017–18 NCAA Division I men's basketball season. They were led by ninth–year head coach Matthew Driscoll and played their home games at UNF Arena on the university's campus in Jacksonville, Florida as members of the Atlantic Sun Conference (ASUN). The Ospreys finished the season 14–19, 7–7 in ASUN play to finish in a tie for fourth place. In the ASUN tournament, they defeated NJIT before losing in the semifinals to Florida Gulf Coast.

Previous season
The Ospreys finished the 2015–16 season 15–19, 8–6 in ASUN play to finish in third place. As the No. 3 seed in the ASUN tournament, they defeated Jacksonville and Lipscomb before losing to Florida Gulf Coast in the championship game.

Offseason

Departures

Incoming transfers

2017 recruiting class

Roster

Schedule and results

|-
!colspan=9 style=| Non-conference regular season

|-
!colspan=9 style=| Atlantic Sun Conference regular season

|-
!colspan=9 style=| Atlantic Sun tournament

References

North Florida Ospreys men's basketball seasons
North Florida
North Florida Ospreys men's basketball
North Florida Ospreys men's basketball